Hitler's 1 September 1939 Reichstag speech is a speech made by Adolf Hitler at an Extraordinary Session of the German Reichstag on 1 September 1939, the day of the German invasion of Poland. The speech served as public declaration of war against Poland and thus of the commencement of World War II (Germany did not submit a formal declaration of war to Poland).

The first shots of the invasion had been fired at around 4:48 am of September 1, by the battleship Schleswig-Holstein. At 5:40 am Hitler issued a declaration to the armed forces: "The Polish state has refused the peaceful settlement of relations which I desired, and appealed to arms... In order to put an end to this lunacy I have no other choice than to meet force with force from now on." At 11:40 am, the German Supreme Command issued a proclamation to the troops ("Soldiers of the German Army – after all other means have failed – weapons must decide."), and this was followed later in the day by Hitler's speech to the Reichstag, meeting at the Kroll Opera House.

Preparations were made – barricades, police – for an expected spontaneous and enthusiastic crowd along Hitler's route to the Opera House. But only a handful of people showed up, and the Berliners were largely apathetic, even grim, and showed no enthusiasm for the war.

The speech followed Hitler's usual pattern, starting out slowly and even haltingly, then proceeding in stages to a crescendo of shouted vituperation. Although some statements in the speech were true, overall it was an "astonishing catalog of lies". Hitler misrepresented in detail the course of diplomatic events preceding the invasion:

  
  
Hitler then spoke of the Molotov–Ribbentrop Pact, which had been signed just ten days before, on August 23. Although news of the pact had been published in the Soviet Union and had by then widely spread throughout the world, this speech included Hitler's first formal declaration of the Pact:

  

Hitler justified the German attack by claiming Polish culpability based on (invented) Polish atrocities at Pitschen and other places, including Gleiwitz and Hochlinden, both of these being part of the culmination of Operation Himmler, a false flag operation intended to demonstrate that the Poles had attacked first, the Gleiwitz incident being the most noted.

  

Hitler then declared himself as the "First soldier of the German Reich" (Erster Soldat des Deutschen Reiches), a self-claimed rank, effectively equivalent of Generalissimo. This was a further step in cementing Hitler's position as supreme commander of the German Armed Forces (Oberbefehlshaber der Deutschen Wehrmacht):

    

William Shirer observed that "Only once that day did Hitler utter the truth. In the end, this once, he would prove as good as his word. But no German I met in Berlin that day noticed that what the Leader was saying quite bluntly was that he could not face, or take, defeat should it come". 

Eleanor Roosevelt wrote "At 5:00 o’clock this morning our telephone rang and it was the President in Washington to tell me the sad news that Germany had invaded Poland and that her planes were bombing Polish cities. He told me that Hitler was about to address the Reichstag, so we turned on the radio and listened until 6:00 o’clock.... As I listened to Hitlers' speech, this letter kept returning to my mind... how can you say that you do not intend to make war on women and children and then send planes to bomb cities?" (In the speech Hitler promised "I will not war against women and children. I have ordered my air force to restrict itself to attacks on military objectives" (Ich will nicht den Kampf gegen Frauen und Kinder führen. Ich habe meiner Luftwaffe den Auftrag gegeben, sich auf militärische Objekte bei ihren Angriffen zu beschränken.))

The New York Times headline for its front-page report of the speech, after leading with quotes that "Bomb Will Be Met by Bomb" and Hitler's vow to "Fight Until Resolution" of the Polish situation, focused on the order of succession decree. In the speech, Hitler had declared that the order of his succession would be Hermann Göring, then Rudolf Hess, then a successor to be chosen by "the Senate" (den Senat) (although there was no Senate, the Reichsrat (Senate) inherited from the Weimar Republic having been abolished on 14 February, 1934.) This was the first announcement of this order of succession. (This designation of Göring as Hitler's successor remained in effect (re-affirmed by a decree of 29 June 1941) until the Göring Telegram of 23 April 1945, in which Göring attempted to use it to justify seizing control of Germany.)

References

External links
 Text of the speech, in German
 Text of the speech, English translation

Speeches by Adolf Hitler
1939 speeches
September 1939 events
1939 in Germany